Akçaköy can refer to the following villages in Turkey:

 Akçaköy, Alaca
 Akçaköy, Çivril
 Akçaköy, Kepsut
 Akçaköy, Köşk
 Akçaköy, Yeşilova